Sir Timothy O'Brien, 1st Baronet (1787 – 3 December 1862) was an Irish Whig, Independent Irish Party and Repeal Association politician, and merchant.

He was the son of Timothy O'Brien and his wife (née Madden). In 1821, he married Catherine Murphy, daughter of Edward Murphy, and they had at least five children: Timothy (died 1869); John (died 1869); Kate (died 1894); Ellen (died 1899); and Patrick (1823–1895).

In 1844, O'Brien was made Lord Mayor of Dublin, a position he again held in 1849. Simultaneously, he was a Member of Parliament (MP), first elected as a Repeal Association member for Cashel at a by-election in 1846—caused by the resignation of Joseph Stock. Becoming an Independent Irish MP in 1852 and a Whig in 1857, he held the seat until the 1859 general election, when he did not seek re-election.

In 1849, during Queen Victoria's first visit to Ireland, O'Brien was made a baronet, becoming 1st baronet of Merrion Square and Boris-in-Ossory. Upon his own death in 1862, the baronetcy was inherited by his son, Patrick O'Brien.

Outside of his political career, O'Brien was also a Justice of the Peace and a Deputy Lieutenant.

References

External links
 

1787 births
1862 deaths
Whig (British political party) MPs for Irish constituencies
Irish Repeal Association MPs
Members of the Parliament of the United Kingdom for County Tipperary constituencies (1801–1922)
Baronets in the Baronetage of the United Kingdom
Lord Mayors of Dublin
Irish justices of the peace
Deputy Lieutenants in Ireland
UK MPs 1841–1847
UK MPs 1847–1852
UK MPs 1852–1857
UK MPs 1857–1859